Lim Dae-hyung (born 28 July 1986) is a South Korean film director and screenwriter.

Personal life 
Born in 1986, Lim graduated from Geumsan High School. He majored in Theatre & Film at Hanyang University.

Filmography 
Lemon Time (short, 2012) - director, screenwriter
The World of If (short, 2014) - director, screenwriter
Merry Christmas Mr. Mo (2017) - director, screenwriter
Moonlit Winter (2019) - director, screenwriter

Awards

References

External links 
 
 
 

1986 births
Living people
South Korean film directors
South Korean screenwriters
Hanyang University alumni